Electric vehicle policies in Australia include incentives such as electric vehicle subsidies, interest-free loans, registration exemptions, stamp duty exemptions, the luxury car tax exemption and discounted parking for both private and commercial purchases. The adoption of plug-in electric vehicles in Australia is driven mostly by state-based electric vehicle targets and monetary incentives to support the adoption and deployment of low- or zero-emission vehicles.

Background

Public opinion
60% of Australians support a nationwide ban on petrol and diesel car sales by 2035. While 65% of Australians want subsidies to make electric vehicles more affordable. The opposition government in Australia in 2019 proposed a 50% electric vehicle target by 2030. The Coalition federal government has its carbon abatement policy anticipating electric vehicles to make up 50% of sales by 2030.

Furthermore, government analysis in 2019 forecasted 50% of all new cars sold in Australia by 2035 will be electric on the current path. Another government forecast indicated the uptake of zero emissions vehicles in Australia would be at a minimum at least 27% by 2030. In fact, 52% of Victorians and Western Australians support a shift of all new car sales to electric vehicles by 2025, which was the highest support of all the states. As reported by the Electric Vehicle Council, 80% of Victorians believe the government should offer more incentives to purchase electric vehicles and encourage the transition to clean transportation. Almost 50% of Victorians also stated they intend to purchase an electric vehicle the next time they buy a car. Victoria and South Australia have both set targets for 50% of new car sales to electric by 2030 and for 100% of new car sales to be electric by 2035. The Victorian Government is advised by an expert advisory panel which will advise increased incentives as the electric vehicle subsidy program progresses. The expert advisory panel is also expected to ensure that Victoria meet their 50% electric vehicle target by 2030. When referring to state based proposed EV taxes, independent senator Rex Patrick said “Australia is on a journey to net zero carbon emissions by 2050. The Morrison Government claims the pathway will be through “technology, not taxes”, yet the Federal Government's standing by and allowing states to impose taxes on that technology, is a clear disincentive. It would also, as the Electric Vehicle Council explained, make Australia the first country in the world to discourage EV uptake. This is not a category we want to be first in". The Federal Government claimed plug-in hybrid cars would have immediate emissions reduction benefits above EVs in most parts of Australia due to the high-level of emissions from Australia's electricity grid. However, this was a flawed analysis as it assumed a vehicle life of only five years, rather than a typical 15 years. It also did not factor in that people often charged EVs from their own rooftop solar panels, and that the three biggest EV charging networks in the country offered 100% zero emissions power.

Non-governmental and private sector advocacy
Uber Australia said “Timing is everything, and unless you’re going to have a significant incentive package, or only charge a token amount, you will dampen uptake and Australia will remain at the back of the pack.” Uber even stated they will reduce their service fee for drivers of electric vehicles by 50% between July 2021 and June 2022. NRMA also recommended the federal government offer subsidies for private EV purchases. NRMA even called for urgent reforms including excluding battery electric cars from the luxury car tax and changing FBT to focus on emissions rather than price. The Federal Chamber of Automotive Industries (FCAI) called for federal and state governments to work together to banish unhelpful policies and regulations if the auto industry is to achieve net-zero goals. The CEO of Volkswagen Australia suggested that the Euro 6 emissions standard should be introduced before its current expected introduction date by 2024 in Australia. This is because Australia has been using the outdated Euro 5 emissions standard since 2011 without any further revisions. A report by the Federal Government also found that the overall benefits of introducing the Euro 6 Fuel Standard earlier or a fuel efficiency standard of 105 grams of CO2 per kilometre, would outweigh the costs. Despite inactivity from the Federal Government to introduce the Euro 6 fuel standard earlier or adjust the fuel emissions standard, Victoria firmly stated that the state government is eager to introduce the Euro 6 Fuel Emissions Standard along with South Australia and New South Wales who plan to have the Euro 6 standard in the NSW 2020–2030 Clean Air Strategy. The ACT and Tasmania are other likely states to join a state-based Euro 6 Fuel Emissions pact based on their EV policies. Australia's lack of adoption of the Euro 6 standard has ranked the country third last among G20 countries for policies to decarbonise transport with Volkswagen likening Australia's EV policies to those of a “third-world country”. For example, Australia's most popular cars emit up to 42% more carbon dioxide than in the UK. Some popular hybrids in Australia also use old engine technology that run on Australia's standard 91RON petrol with 150 parts per million of sulphur, which is 5 times worse than global best practice. However, Volkswagen stated the New South Wales Government's country leading electric vehicle policies are due to take Australia out of the “automotive third world”.

The Electric Vehicle Council and the principal clean energy transition advisor for Ernst and Young, urged the Australian government to introduce a complete ban on new petrol and diesel car sales from 2035 as seen in the UK, and add hybrids to the black list. Two of the world's largest right-hand-drive markets are intending to eliminate petrol and diesel vehicle sales by 2030.

Political advocacy
The Canberra Greens stated they would give consumers and businesses $10,000 towards buying an electric car or motorbike in 2020. The Canberra Greens also supported free registration for electric vehicle owners. Furthermore, they stated they would target 90% of new vehicle sales to be electric by 2030. As part of the plan, the ACT Greens also wanted to see public transport, garbage trucks, taxis and ride share vehicles transition entirely to electric vehicles by 2035.

Federal policy
A final National Electric Vehicle Strategy is set to be released by mid 2021 by the Federal Liberal Government. This was expected to include federal tax rebates and direct vehicle subsidies as offered through similar federal government policies in the United States, Europe and China.

Government vehicle fleet
The initial federal government's electric vehicle strategy was criticised as being too heavily reliant on commercial buyers to increase the overall uptake of EVs in Australia, through fleet purchases. This is in comparison to policies in the UK, Japan, France, Germany, Norway and the US which offer approximately $10,000 in subsidies each for specifically increasing private consumer purchases of EVs. Electric vehicle rebates and subsidies up to $20,000 AUD have also been shown to be effective in increasing the uptake of EVs in European countries and certain states in the US. Uber also stated it would be difficult for their drivers to transition to electric vehicles by 2030 in Australia without any subsidies or policies aimed to support consumer uptake of EVs.

A Comcar trial of electric cars within the federal government fleet is also to be undertaken until the end of 2022. This is in comparison to New Zealand where all government vehicles and the entire bus fleet must be zero emissions by 2025.

The federal government even insisted that fleets should transition through hybrids first, and then electric vehicles. However, various independent studies have shown EVs are already competitive in leasing arrangements when compared to hybrids. BMW Group Australia have a program offering a $1,500 incentive for new vehicle purchases for company use by small to medium enterprises seeking to purchase a new BMW or Mini BEV or PHEV. BMW also offer Australian small and medium-sized business a complimentary electric bicycle if they purchases a new BMW or Mini plug in electric car before the end of June 2021. NSW Transport Minister Andrew Constance said "We've got to be incredibly bullish on the incentive side, and signals to the market are important in this environment, because we need scale". NSW Environment Minister Matt Kean stated when referring to electric cars "I want to see NSW the leader not only in the country but on the global stage when it comes to that new economy that's coming whether we like it or not". Therefore, it is highly likely NSW intend for 100% of new car sales to be fully electric vehicles before 2035 and to offer free registration and stamp duty on EVs to truly lead other states like South Australia and the ACT. NSW would also need to offer $15,000 interest free loans towards the purchase of EVs to remain ahead of the ACT's effective electric vehicle incentives.  This also includes New South Wales advocating with the South Australian Liberal Government for better national vehicle fuel efficiency and fuel quality.

Luxury car tax
The Australian government offers a higher luxury tax threshold for qualifying low emissions vehicles and electric vehicles. The Luxury Car Tax threshold for low and zero emissions vehicles was lifted in 2020 to $77,565. The Senate inquiry into EVs run by independent Tim Storer heard that reducing the threshold for LCT to $57,000 for inefficient petrol and diesel cars, and tightening the limit to 4l/100 km, would save $1.5 billion over four years, and more than $5 billion out to 2028. “We believe that the luxury car tax (LCT) should be abolished for EV/Hybrid vehicles as a direct incentive to purchase more environmentally friendly vehicles. United States currently still offer a federal tax credit as an incentive to purchase EV/hybrid vehicles,” wrote Brenton Sword, who started a petition on change.org.

State policy

Victoria
The Victorian Government encourages the use of electric cars as part of its strategy to tackle climate change with a long-term target of net zero greenhouse gas emissions by 2050. The Victorian Government recognise that unless Victorians adopt zero emission vehicles at a faster pace than current trends, the state's legislated target of net zero emissions by 2050 will not be met. Victoria's peak infrastructure advisory body also advised the Victorian Government to remove registration fees for EVs. The Victorian peak infrastructure advisory body also recommended that the entire Victorian bus fleet should be transitioned to electric vehicles. Additionally, it was recommended that Victoria establish a date for the ban on the sale of internal combustion-engine vehicles. In May 2021 the Victorian Government released a Zero Emissions Vehicle Roadmap to support the adoption of electric vehicles.

Victoria also proposed a road user charge for electric vehicles, however there are legal complications and potential constitutionality issues relating to the tax.  The Labor Party's tax was also almost defeated due to the lack of support to pass the legislation in parliament's upper house, but was passed in May 2021.

Queensland 
Queensland has stated they will not introduce an EV tax.

South Australia 
The South Australian Government would only propose an EV tax no earlier than 2027 or when 30% of new car sales are EVs. In 2020 the state parliament introduced an EV tax that would be defeated with the majority of the parliament voting in opposition.

Western Australia 
In late 2020 Volvo announced that they would be providing electric buses to Western Australia, they were expected to be in operation as of early 2022. In March 2022 the first Volvo electric bus commenced operation in Perth, this is the only one so far.

New South Wales
New South Wales announced country leading electric vehicle policies in 2021 and plan to become the “Norway of Australia”. The New South Wales Government reassured they would not introduce an EV tax until 2027 at the earliest or when 30% to 50% of new car sales in NSW were electric vehicles. The New South Wales Liberal Government released an electric car strategy with incentives to encourage the use of electric vehicles in mid 2021. The New South Wales government stated they would take a holistic approach if a proposed road user charge were implemented, stating they wish not to impede the growth of electric vehicles in the state.  The New South Wales government said ‘‘We’re working on a holistic package to announce in the budget’’. This suggests the New South Wales government will offer new incentives to encourage EV uptake. This is because a report in 2020 showed a road user tax on clean cars introduced without additional incentives could discourage uptake of EVs and impede greenhouse gas emission reductions. The NSW treasurer Dominic Perrottet reassured such a tax will not be instituted in NSW, at least until 50% of new car sales were electric, meaning 2030 at the earliest NSW Environment Minister Matt Kean said he wanted to “turbo charge” the uptake of electric cars in the state and believed a road user charge for EVs should not be introduced. NSW's transport minister said it is "crazy" that the first discussion in Australia around electric vehicles was about taxing them. "I think it's mad to go and tax an early uptake of an innovation that we know will save community health and save our environment," he said. He said rolling out a distance-based tax on electric car owners (as the state treasurer flagged) would make them the “laughing stock of the world”. It is for this reason NSW delayed the introduction of a per-kilometre tax on electric vehicles until 30% of new car sales are EVs or no earlier than 2027. Tesla, Volkswagen, Nissan, Hyundai and AGL praised NSW's country leading electric vehicle policies. JET Charge also said they would dramatically increase their NSW operations in response to the 2021 EV policy. The Federal Chamber of Automotive Industries has called for a single, national, simple road user charge which would replace all other car taxes, including fuel excise, registration, stamp duty and luxury taxes. This would ensure all drivers pay a road user charge instead of only EV drivers.

The NSW government has more than 100 electric buses in operation in 2022, and plan to fully transition Greater Sydney's fleet of 8000+ buses to electric counterparts by 2035.

Australian Capital Territory 
As of late 2022 the ACT offers the most financial and non-financial incentives for purchasing electric vehicles of any state in Australia. Accordingly, the Australian Capital Territory has the highest rate of EV sales of any state with 83 EVs per 10,000 new car sales. Supporting this high rate is the fact that electric vehicles sold in the ACT are stamp duty exempt and receive a 20% reduction in registration fees. The ACT government is further supporting electric vehicle adoption by trialing V2G (Vehicle-To-Grid) technology with 50 EV owners.

ACT energy minister Shane Rattenbury said a road-user tax on clean cars was a “disastrous policy” and said “I would encourage those other states to rethink their strategies”. He also called on state governments to abandon plans to slug electric vehicles with new taxes and said “It is extraordinary to me that some jurisdictions are disincentivising EVs at a time when they constitute less than 1% of new vehicle sales and we really need to be encouraging their rapid uptake”.

Overview of federal, state and territory government incentives and policy

Business only electric vehicle incentives 

BMW Group Australia have a program offering a $1,500 incentive for new vehicle purchases for company use by small to medium enterprises seeking to purchase a new BMW or Mini BEV or PHEV.

Electric vehicles can be sourced through fleet management companies (FMOs) and fleet leasing companies.

References 

Environmental charities based in Australia